The FEI World Cup Jumping 2010/2011 was the 33rd edition of the premier international show jumping competition run by the FEI. The final was held at the Leipzig Trade Fair in Leipzig, Germany, from April 27, 2011, to May 1, 2011. Marcus Ehning of Germany was the defending champion, having won the final the previous year (2009/10) in Le Grand-Saconnex near Geneva, Switzerland.

Arab League

Caucasian League

Central Asian League

Central European League

North Sub-League

South Sub-League

Final

Japan League

North American League

East Coast

West Coast

Pacific League

Australia

New Zealand

South African League

South American League

South East Asia League

Western European League

World Cup Final

References

 show jumping result search of the International Federation of Equestrian Sports

External links
Official website
Complete event schedule

2010 in show jumping
2011 in show jumping
2010 2011